Sir Arnold Horace Santo Waters,  (23 September 1886 – 22 January 1981) was a British engineer, soldier and an English recipient of the Victoria Cross, the highest award for gallantry in the face of the enemy that can be awarded to British and Commonwealth forces.

Details
He was 32 years old, and an acting major in the 218th Field Company, Corps of Royal Engineers, British Army during the First World War at the second battle of the Sambre when the following deed took place for which he was awarded the VC:

On 4 November 1918 near Ors, France, Major Waters, with his Field Company, was bridging the Oise-Sambre Canal under artillery and machine-gun fire at close range, the bridge being damaged and the building party suffering severe casualties. All Major Waters' officers had been killed or wounded and he at once went forward and personally supervised the completion of the bridge, working on cork floats while under such intense fire that it seemed impossible that he could survive. The success of the operation was entirely due to his valour and example.

Further information
Later he was knighted, becoming Sir Arnold Waters. He was the President of the Institution of Structural Engineers in 1933–34 and 1943–1944, the only person to hold the post twice.

The medal
His Victoria Cross is displayed at the Royal Engineers Museum, Chatham, Kent.

References

External links
Royal Engineers Museum Sappers VCs
Location of grave and VC medal (Warwickshire)

1886 births
1981 deaths
Engineers from Plymouth, Devon
Royal Engineers officers
British Army personnel of World War I
British World War I recipients of the Victoria Cross
Recipients of the Military Cross
Commanders of the Order of the British Empire
Companions of the Distinguished Service Order
Knights Bachelor
Presidents of the Institution of Structural Engineers
British Army recipients of the Victoria Cross
Military personnel from Plymouth, Devon